The Sonoma County Open was a golf tournament on the Nike Tour. It ran from 1990 to 1995. It was played at Windsor Golf Course in Windsor, California.

In 1995 the winner earned $36,000.

Winners

References

Former Korn Ferry Tour events
Golf in California
Sports in Sonoma County, California
Windsor, California
Recurring sporting events established in 1990
Recurring sporting events disestablished in 1995